Nepal has Participated all 13 South Asian Games governed by South Asia Olympic Council.

Nepal has been 2nd-ranked 2 times. Best Performance by Nepal was in 2019 South Asian Games where they finished the medal tally 2nd with highest ever total medal counts of 207 including 51 Gold Medals.

Host Games 
Nepal has hosted South Asian Games three times : 1984 Kathmandu, 1999 Kathmandu, 2019 Kathmandu/Pokhara/Janakpur.

Detailed Medal Count

External links 

 https://olympics.com/ioc/nepal
 https://www.nocnepal.org.np/

References 

 
South Asian Games
Nations at the South Asian Games